Lisnowo  is a village in the administrative district of Gmina Świecie nad Osą, within Grudziądz County, Kuyavian-Pomeranian Voivodeship, in north-central Poland.
Among dr Marian Majkowski's notable designs is the church in this village.

The village has a population of 760.

History
During the German occupation of Poland (World War II), Lisnowo was one of the sites of executions of Poles, carried out by the Germans in 1939 as part of the Intelligenzaktion.

References

Lisnowo